Graphipterus is a genus of beetles in the family Carabidae, containing the following 139 species:

 Graphipterus albolineatus (Wallengren, 1881) 
 Graphipterus albomarginatus Quedenfeldt, 1883 
 Graphipterus alluaudi Basilewsky, 1977 
 Graphipterus alternatus Burgeon, 1928 
 Graphipterus amabilis Boheman, 1860 
 Graphipterus amicus Peringuey, 1892 
 Graphipterus ancora Dejean, 1831 
 Graphipterus andersoni Chaudoir, 1870 
 Graphipterus angolanus Basilewsky, 1977 
 Graphipterus angustus Peringuey, 1888 
 Graphipterus arrowi Burgeon, 1928 
 Graphipterus assimilis Peringuey, 1896 
 Graphipterus atrimedius Chaudoir, 1870 
 Graphipterus babaulti Basilewsky, 1977 
 Graphipterus barthelemyi Dejean, 1830
 Graphipterus basalis Peringuey, 1896 
 Graphipterus basilewskyi Werner, 2003 
 Graphipterus basivittatus Basilewsky, 1977 
 Graphipterus bilineatus Boheman, 1860 
 Graphipterus bivittatus Boheman, 1848 
 Graphipterus bonvouloiri Chaudoir, 1870 
 Graphipterus brunellii G.Muller, 1941 
 Graphipterus calcaratus Obst, 1908 
 Graphipterus castanopterus Fairmaire, 1884 
 Graphipterus chaudoiri Peringuey, 1888 
 Graphipterus cicindeloides (Swederus, 1787) 
 Graphipterus cinctus Chaudoir In Oberthur, 1883 
 Graphipterus cineraceus Fairmaire, 1882 
 Graphipterus cinerarius Fairmaire, 1894 
 Graphipterus circumcinctus (Boheman, 1848) 
 Graphipterus circumdatus Raffray, 1885 
 Graphipterus clarkei Basilewsky, 1977 
 Graphipterus congoensis Burgeon, 1928 
 Graphipterus cordiger Dejean, 1831 
 Graphipterus crampeli Alluaud, 1914 
 Graphipterus cursor Peringuey, 1888 
 Graphipterus damarensis Peringuey, 1896 
 Graphipterus deceptor Peringuey, 1892 
 Graphipterus decipiatus Basilewsky, 1977 
 Graphipterus discicollis Fairmaire, 1884 
 Graphipterus dissimilis Basilewsky, 1986 
 Graphipterus dolosus Basilewsky, 1977 
 Graphipterus dukei Basilewsky, 1986 
 Graphipterus duvivieri Burgeon, 1929 
 Graphipterus dymorphus Burgeon, 1928 
 Graphipterus ellipticus Burgeon, 1928 
 Graphipterus endroedyi Basilewsky, 1977 
 Graphipterus erikssoni Peringuey, 1892 
 Graphipterus erraticus Basilewsky, 1977 
 Graphipterus exclamationifer Burgeon, 1928 
 Graphipterus exclamationis (Fabricius, 1792) 
 Graphipterus fallaciosus Basilewsky, 1986 
 Graphipterus fasciatus Chaudoir, 1870 
 Graphipterus femoratus Chevrolat, 1835 
 Graphipterus fritschi Chaudoir In Oberthur, 1883 
 Graphipterus frontalis Boheman, 1848 
 Graphipterus galla Gestro, 1895 
 Graphipterus geminatus Peringuey, 1896 
 Graphipterus gestroi Alluaud, 1923 
 Graphipterus gilli Burgeon, 1929 
 Graphipterus griseolineatus Burgeon, 1928 
 Graphipterus griseus Chaudoir, 1870 
 Graphipterus hammondi Basilewsky, 1977 
 Graphipterus hessei Burgeon, 1929 
 Graphipterus holmi Basilewsky, 1986 
 Graphipterus horni Burgeon, 1928 
 Graphipterus incanus Dejean, 1831 
 Graphipterus insidiosus Peringuey, 1896 
 Graphipterus interlineatus Alluaud, 1926 
 Graphipterus jubae Alluaud, 1923 
 Graphipterus katangae Burgeon, 1929 
 Graphipterus kochi Basilewsky, 1956 
 Graphipterus laevisignatus Basilewsky, 1986 
 Graphipterus lateralis (Boheman, 1848) 
 Graphipterus laticollis Harold, 1878 
 Graphipterus limbatus Laporte De Castelnau, 1840 
 Graphipterus lineelus Peringuey, 1896 
 Graphipterus lineolatus (Boheman, 1848) 
 Graphipterus longulus Burgeon, 1929 
 Graphipterus lorenzi Werner, 2007 
 Graphipterus louwi Basilewsky, 1977 
 Graphipterus luctuosus Dejean, 1825
 Graphipterus lugens Chaudoir, 1870 
 Graphipterus macrocephalus Boheman, 1848 
 Graphipterus marginatus Boheman, 1860 
 Graphipterus marshalli Burgeon, 1928 
 Graphipterus mashunus Peringuey, 1896 
 Graphipterus michaelseni Kuntzen, 1919 
 Graphipterus minutus Dejean, 1822
 Graphipterus miskelli Basilewsky, 1981 
 Graphipterus mouffleti Kuntzen, 1919 
 Graphipterus namanus Basilewsky, 1977 
 Graphipterus nanniscus Peringuey, 1896 
 Graphipterus neavei Burgeon, 1928 
 Graphipterus njarassae Basilewsky, 1977 
 Graphipterus nyassicus Burgeon, 1928 
 Graphipterus obliteratus Boheman, 1860 
 Graphipterus obsoletus (Olivier, 1795) 
 Graphipterus omophractus Basilewsky, 1977 
 Graphipterus ornatus Burgeon, 1928 
 Graphipterus patrizii Alluaud, 1923 
 Graphipterus penrithae Basilewsky, 1977 
 Graphipterus plagiatus Boheman, 1848 
 Graphipterus plesius Basilewsky, 1977 
 Graphipterus plurifasciatus Basilewsky, 1977 
 Graphipterus pronitens Basilewsky, 1977 
 Graphipterus provitiosus Basilewsky, 1977 
 Graphipterus pseudofrontalis Burgeon, 1929 
 Graphipterus rhodesianus Burgeon, 1928 
 Graphipterus salinae Bertoloni, 1849 
 Graphipterus samburuensis Burgeon, 1928 
 Graphipterus sennariensis Laporte De Castelnau, 1835 
 Graphipterus serrator Forskal, 1775 
 Graphipterus sexvittatus Chaudoir, 1870 
 Graphipterus simillimus Basilewsky, 1977 
 Graphipterus snizeki Werner, 2007 
 Graphipterus somereni Basilewsky, 1977 
 Graphipterus soricinus Fairmaire, 1882 
 Graphipterus speculifer Burgeon, 1928 
 Graphipterus sublimbatus Basilewsky, 1977 
 Graphipterus subsuturalis Basilewsky, 1977 
 Graphipterus suspectus Peringuey, 1896 
 Graphipterus suturalis Boheman, 1860 
 Graphipterus suturiger Chaudoir, 1870 
 Graphipterus tellinii G.Muller, 1941 
 Graphipterus tibialis Chaudoir, 1870 
 Graphipterus tichyi Werner, 2007 
 Graphipterus trilineatus (Fabricius, 1787) 
 Graphipterus tristis Klug, 1855 
 Graphipterus tuky Basilewsky, 1937 
 Graphipterus upembanus Basilewsky, 1953 
 Graphipterus velox Peringuey, 1888 
 Graphipterus velutinus Boheman, 1848 
 Graphipterus vestitus Dejean, 1831 
 Graphipterus vittatus Dejean, 1831 
 Graphipterus vitticollis G.Muller, 1938 
 Graphipterus vittiger Peringuey, 1888 
 Graphipterus voltae Basilewsky, 1943 
 Graphipterus youngai Basilewsky, 1986

References

Lebiinae